Great Tottington is a moated manor farm near Maidstone in the English county of Kent. It is also the site of a spring, around which are scattered numerous sarsen stones which may be the remains of a Neolithic monument and part of the Medway megaliths. Further stones lie around the farmyard. Rather than being genuine megaliths, they may be a recent collection of natural stones brought to the site by eighteenth century farmers clearing the surrounding land. The destruction visited on the megalithic sites of the Medway valley during the eighteenth and nineteenth centuries makes conclusive diagnosis difficult.

In 1872 James Fergusson visited the area and noted:

A footnote records that one stone was almost completely underground, and the other partially buried, and that the dimensions were obtained by probing underground.

Theories that the stones are the remains of a stone circle or avenue have been suggested. If the stones are prehistoric however, it is more likely that they were brought from the nearby site of the chambered long barrow known as the Coffin Stone.

Further reading
  

Archaeological sites in Kent
Borough of Maidstone